The 1986 NCAA Division II men's basketball tournament involved 32 schools playing in a single-elimination tournament to determine the national champion of men's NCAA Division II college basketball as a culmination of the 1985–86 NCAA Division II men's basketball season. It was won by Sacred Heart University and Sacred Heart's Roger Younger was the Most Outstanding Player.

Regional participants

*denotes tie

Regionals

Great Lakes - Fairborn, Ohio 
Location: Physical Education Building Host: Wright State University

Third Place - Kentucky Wesleyan 91, Lewis 81

East - Erie, Pennsylvania 
Location: Hammermill Center Host: Gannon University

Third Place - Millersville 107, Edinboro 86

South Central - Cape Girardeau, Missouri 
Location: Houck Field House Host: Southeast Missouri State University

Third Place - Abilene Christian 73, Sam Houston 60

West - Hayward, California 
Location: Pioneer Gymnasium Host: California State University, Hayward

Third Place - UC Riverside 55, Cal Poly 53

North Central - St. Cloud, Minnesota 
Location: Halenbeck Hall Host: St. Cloud State University

Third Place - Eastern Montana 86, Augustana 61

South - Tampa, Florida 
Location: Spartan Sports Arena Host: University of Tampa

Third Place - West Georgia 104, Alabama A&M 84

South Atlantic - Emmitsburg, Maryland 
Location: Memorial Gym Host: Mount Saint Mary's College and Seminary

Third Place - Virginia Union 95, Winston-Salem State 77

New England - Manchester, New Hampshire 
Location: NHC Fieldhouse Host: New Hampshire College

Third Place - Springfield 70, St. Anselm 65

*denotes each overtime played

National Quarterfinals

National Finals - Springfield, Massachusetts
Location: Springfield Civic Center Hosts: American International College and Springfield College

*denotes each overtime played

All-tournament team
 Riley Ellis (Southeast Missouri State)
 Keith Johnson (Sacred Heart)
 Ronny Rankin (Southeast Missouri State)
 Kevin Stevens (Sacred Heart)
 Roger Younger (Sacred Heart)

See also
1986 NCAA Division I men's basketball tournament
1986 NCAA Division III men's basketball tournament
1986 NAIA men's basketball tournament
1986 NCAA Division II women's basketball tournament

References

Sources
 2010 NCAA Men's Basketball Championship Tournament Records and Statistics: Division II men's basketball Championship
 1986 NCAA Division II men's basketball tournament jonfmorse.com

NCAA Division II men's basketball tournament
Tournament
NCAA Division II basketball tournament
NCAA Division II basketball tournament